"Supervixen" is an alternative rock song written and performed by alternative rock band Garbage and is the opening track on their self-titled debut studio album (1995). The song was titled after Russ Meyer's 1975 sexploitation film Supervixens but was influenced by Pier Paolo Pasolini's period horror art film Salò, or the 120 Days of Sodom, which had been playing on a monitor above the soundboard at Smart Studios when the band were working on it.

In the United States, "Supervixen" was released as an airplay-only single to alternative radio in October 1996. At the time, "Stupid Girl" was still charting highly on the Billboard Hot 100, and the band's debut album had been certified platinum by the Recording Industry Association of America (RIAA) for shipping a million units within the United States.

Composition

"Supervixen" was written by Garbage in 1994 during sessions between band members Butch Vig, Duke Erikson, Shirley Manson and Steve Marker at Smart Studios in Madison, Wisconsin. Madison session musician Mike Kashou performed bass guitar on "Supervixen". Manson felt that "Supervixen" was the hardest of all the debut set's songs to get right: "The lyrics of that song must’ve changed about 5 million times," adding that the track originally began as an ode to Chris Cornell. "Then it turned into a song about obsession and worship. Lyrically, it went through a lot of changes and melodies — this, that and the next thing." Manson fought with the rest of the band over a rap-lite vocal she had ad-libbed in the recording booth ("Now I want it too much, now I wanted to stop, now I'm lucky like a falling star fell over me") that she was particularly fond of. She won out, and the part was looped as a backing vocal towards the end of the song. Another part ("yeah, you worry too much, now it's got to be stopped") did not.

Much of the song was built around repeated silences peppered throughout the instrumental sections. The idea for the silences came when the tracking tape kept slipping during mixing. The band had looped a sustained guitar part consisting of two separate pitch-shifted guitar lines but their tape machine's playback function was faulty - parking instead of synching up both ends of the loop seamlessly. The band liked the way the effect had sounded, even though it originated from an unintentional hardware fault: "Basically it goes to dead air, and in a way it's just silence, but that also becomes a hook", Vig later commented. The effect was utilized by the band throughout the structure of "Supervixen", with some of the sections featuring other elements continuing through the deliberate pauses. To achieve this, the band had to make use of extensive muting to keep the final mix tight. Masterdisk's Scott Hull digitally removed the muted sections during the mastering of "Supervixen" to emphasize the silences. Reflecting back on this effect 25 years later, Manson stated: "These really incredible stops at the beginning of that song... Nowadays that’s so easy to replicate because we’re all recording digitally, but what’s so astounding about "Supervixen" was [that] it was all done on analog. It was quite difficult to do when you couldn’t just flip a button."

Lyrically, Manson stated that "Supervixen" "is all about saying 'idolise me, I'm going to give you everything you want, but you have to do something in return'. It's a bargaining song about a relationship. I'm not saying "I'm a wee Scottish lass fae Edinburgh and I'm great". It's actually about this supervixen, this Russ Meyer-type woman." Vig and Manson declared that the song's controlling tone is tongue-in-cheek, but Vig made sure to point out that during the live performances Manson's domination "[was] also kind of becoming real every night."

Release

Following the success of "Stupid Girl" at alternative radio while the band had supported Smashing Pumpkins' Mellon Collie/Infinite Sadness tour, and the further success of the Todd Terry remix at mainstream radio, Almo serviced a radio edit of "Supervixen" to alternative on October 15, 1996. "Supervixen" was already playlisted pre-release and being hammered daily by KROQ in Los Angeles, KNDD in Seattle and KOME in San Diego; upon official servicing the track was added to a further 45 station playlists. "Supervixen" debuted at #50 on industry publication R&Rs Alternative chart after its second week at radio.

After Garbage's manager Shannon O'Shea gave a couple of stations the jump by providing early copies of the track, Capitol Records serviced "#1 Crush" to alternative radio as the first single lifted from William Shakespeare’s Romeo + Juliet: Music From the Motion Picture on October 29, 1996. "#1 Crush" quickly got added to 22 station playlists, even as "Supervixen" was increasing in audience and total plays; reaching #44 on R&R'''s chart. The following week, "#1 Crush" was the Most Added track at alternative, eclipsing "Supervixen" by adding a further 38 stations, while "Supervixen" gained none. The following week, fourteen stations dropped "Supervixen" as it sank bank to #50, while "#1 Crush" soared ahead, gaining more adds and almost tripling its weekly play total. Despite posting on music industry reports, "Supervixen" ultimately did not register a place on the publicly released Billboard Modern Rock Tracks chart. By this time, Almo Sounds was now focused on servicing "Milk" as the final single at retail from the debut album. "#1 Crush" ultimately outperformed both, spending a month at #1 on the alternative chart, and reaching #29 on the airplay chart.

"Supervixen" was initially licensed to the soundtrack of the 1997 horror movie Nightwatch as a song that the main character listened to on a headphones while working in a morgue. The release of the movie was delayed by 18 months; in the released version, R.E.M.'s "The Wake Up Bomb" soundtracks the specific scene instead.

In 2015, an early demo mix of "Supervixen", with alternate chorus lyrics, was included as a previously unreleased bonus track on Garbage (20th Anniversary Super Deluxe Edition).

Critical reception
Supervixen" received a largely positive response from music critics, many of whom chose to single out the track in their reviews of the Garbage album. The Jewish Chronicle wrote "from the staccato riff that dominates 'Supervixen' the scene is set – Eurythmics meets Patti Smith in some Grungy nightclub where bitchy back-biting is the name of the game." Hot Press reviewer Jackie Hayden wrote "The sound drop outs should act as a warning to be on your guard". Kerrang!s Paul Rees described the song as "a whirlpool of clattering synth stabs that break of in shattered shards", and Paul Yates of Q magazine said that "Garbage's signature lies in songs like "Supervixen", good pop tunes dealt a rough treatment and brazen vocals". Jamie T. Conway, of Ikon, gave a negative review for the album but described "Supervixen" as Pixies-lite and a "strangely appealing" exception. Rolling Stone wrote, "Immediately, as the mangy riffs of "Supervixen" begin to chum through space, Garbage drags you someplace else. As Manson's violet throatiness offers to create "a whole new religion," beats chatter, and delicate acoustic guitar notes and those opening riffs float in and out of the songs gently pounding rhythmic foundations. At times the main riff pauses to halt the music altogether."

Peter Murphy of Hot Press wrote of "Supervixen" in his biography for 2007's Absolute Garbage'' sleeve notes: "The song used silence in a way I'd never heard before. When the music stopped, it wasn't a pause for effect. There was no residual cymbal swish or reverberation or amp hum. That silence was total. It meant business. It was a sort of black hole implosion into which you feared your soul might be sucked."

Credits and personnel
 

Garbage
 Shirley Manson – vocals, guitar
 Steve Marker – guitars, bass, samples and loops
 Duke Erikson – guitars, keyboards, six-string and fuzz bass
 Butch Vig – drums, loops, noise and efx

Additional musicians
 Mike Kashou – bass

Recorded & produced by Garbage
Recorded at Smart Studios in Madison, Wisconsin, USA
Second engineer: Mike Zirkel
Mastered: Howie Weinberg (Masterdisk)
Editing & post production: Scott Hull (Masterdisk)

References

External links

1995 songs
Garbage (band) songs
Song recordings produced by Butch Vig
Songs written by Shirley Manson
Songs written by Duke Erikson
Songs written by Steve Marker
Songs written by Butch Vig